Patagonia peregrinum is a species of snout moth in the genus Patagonia. It was described by Carl Heinrich in 1956. It is found in North America, including Arizona, California and Iowa.

The wingspan is 27 mm.

References

Moths described in 1956
Phycitini